Skrzydłowo may refer to:
 Skrzydłowo, Pomeranian Voivodeship, Poland
 Skrzydłowo, West Pomeranian Voivodeship, Poland